Mount Aurora is a round-topped volcanic summit,  high, the highest point on Black Island in the Ross Archipelago. It was named by the New Zealand Geological Survey Antarctic Expedition (1958–59) after the Aurora, the vessel which conveyed the Ross Sea Party of Ernest Shackleton's Imperial Trans-Antarctic Expedition (1914–17) to McMurdo Sound.

See also
Jungk Hill, mostly ice-free hill 1.7 nautical miles (3 km) northeast of Mount Aurora
Mount Estes, mountain 2.5 nautical miles (5 km) south of Mount Aurora

References
 

Volcanoes of the Ross Dependency
Black Island (Ross Archipelago)
Pleistocene lava domes